Shipton Bellinger is a village and civil parish in Hampshire, England.

It is on the A338 road, near its junction with the A303 road. It is in the Test Valley council district but its post town is Tidworth in Wiltshire.

The village is surrounded by Salisbury Plain. It is close to Tidworth Camp and a number of British Army families live in the village.

Notable features in the village include the Norman Church of England parish church of Saint Peter and the River Bourne.

Village facilities include a public house, a sports and social club, a village shop and visiting Mobile Post Office, a primary school, a village hall, an inn and a garage.

References

External links

 Shipton Bellinger Parish Council
 Shipton Bellinger – Victoria County History, 1911 – via British History Online

Villages in Hampshire
Test Valley